Zambia competed in the 2008 Summer Olympics in Beijing, the People's Republic of China, sending eight athletes to the competition. The use of Simplified Chinese stroke count placed it last before the host nation in the Parade of Nations as it takes sixteen strokes to write the first character and four to write the second.

Athletics

One of the two Zambian athletes managed to advance beyond the opening heats, Rachael Nachula in the women's 400 metres. In her semifinal, however, Nachula finished last and did not make the final.

Men

Women

Key
Note–Ranks given for track events are within the athlete's heat only
Q = Qualified for the next round
q = Qualified for the next round as a fastest loser or, in field events, by position without achieving the qualifying target
NR = National record
N/A = Round not applicable for the event
Bye = Athlete not required to compete in round

Badminton

Boxing

Zambia qualified two boxers for the Olympic boxing tournament. Bwalya qualified at the first African qualifying tournament.
 Chiyanika earned his spot at the second qualifier. All three lost their first bouts and failed to advance.

Swimming

Both Zambian swimmers participated in the 50 metre freestyle, but neither of them managed to advance past the first round.

Men

Women

Qualifiers for the latter rounds of all events are decided on a time only basis, therefore positions shown are overall results versus competitors in all heats.

See also
 Zambia at the 2008 Summer Paralympics

References

Official 2008 Summer Olympics Results Website

Nations at the 2008 Summer Olympics
2008
Summer Olympics